Jacques Boigelot (23 August 1929 – 4 March 2023) was a Belgian film director and screenwriter. He was for many years the head of the French Belgian television film department. His film Paix sur les champs (1970) was nominated for the Academy Award for Best Foreign Language Film.

Boigelot died on 4 March 2023, at the age of 93.

References

External links

1929 births
2023 deaths
Belgian film directors
Belgian screenwriters